Meaghan DeWarrenne-Waller (born October 16, 1989) is a Canadian fashion model, best known for winning cycle 3 of Canada's Next Top Model.

Early life
Waller was born on October 16, 1989 in Thunder Bay, Ontario to a Scottish mother and a Canadian father of Polish/Ukrainian/ Icelandic descent. At the age of two, she moved to Winnipeg, Manitoba, where she attended Ecole Dieppe, Charleswood Junior High and Oak Park High School and was an architecture student at the University of Manitoba.

Canada's Next Top Model
Waller was scouted for the third cycle of Canada's Next Top Model while working retail in Winnipeg. After attending an audition in Toronto, she was selected as one of the finalists from over 6,000 applicants. She received photo of the week once, and was in the bottom two in the last two weeks of the competition, surviving both times over Maryam Massoumi and Nikita Kiceluk. She won the competition against Linsay Willier.

Modelling career

Print work 
Waller appeared on the cover of Fashion magazine twice, once with fellow contestants of Canada's Next Top Model, and again as part of her prize for winning the contest. She shot an ad campaign for Capezio shoes, and appeared in magazines Clin d'oeil, SANDBOX, Marie Claire, Elle, Cosmopolitan, harpers bazaar and vogue. She modeled for department stores Bloomingdale's, Saks Fifth Avenue and Barneys New York. as well as Amazon fashion, and many more. She has also modeled for Vogue.com.

Runway 
Waller walked in London Fashion Week and LG Fashion Week in 2009, and in Sydney Fashion Week in 2012. She also walked for Donna Karan, J. Mendel, ODLR, Just Cavalli, Armani, Monique Lhuillier, Zimmermann, Milly, Marissa Webb, Hanley Mellon and Banana Republic. Naeem Khan.

References

External links

Meaghan Waller at ChrisD.ca
Meaghan Waller at Access Winnipeg
Meaghan Waller Fashion Magazine
 Meaghan Waller All-CNTM Gallery

1989 births
Female models from Ontario
Living people
Next Top Model winners
Participants in Canadian reality television series
People from Thunder Bay
People from Winnipeg
Canada's Next Top Model participants
Canadian people of Polish descent
Canadian people of Scottish descent
Canadian people of Ukrainian descent